Аdelchi Serena (27 December 1895 – 29 January 1970) was an Italian government official and fascist politician. He was party secretary of the National Fascist Party (PNF) from October 1940 until December 1941.

Biography 
Adelchi Serena was born in 1895 in L'Aquila. After finishing judicial exams, he worked as an attorney. In 1915, he volunteered for the Royal Italian Army and participated in World War I, and was awarded a medal for military prowess. In 1921, he joined the Fascist movement and become a member of the PNF. In 1922, he became party secretary, and in 1926 he was nominated mayor of L'Aquila. From 1924 to 1939, he served as a deputy in the lower house of the Parliament of the Kingdom of Italy, the Chamber of Deputies. From 1932, he was a member of the directory of the PNF, and was a member of the Grand Council of Fascism in 1934–1937 and in 1940–1941. From 1933 to 1939, he was deputy to Achille Starace, national secretary of the PNF. From 1936 to 1939, he led active propaganda for the Second Italo-Ethiopian War. In 1939, he became Minister of Public Works. On 30 October 1940, he succeeded Ettore Muti as national secretary of the PNF. On 26 December 1941, he was replaced by Aldo Vidussoni. After the fall of the Fascist regime in Italy on 25 July 1943, he left politics and withdrew to private life. He died in 1970 in Rome.

References

Bibliography

External links 
 

1895 births
1970 deaths
Italian Ministers of Public Works
Mussolini Cabinet
National Fascist Party politicians
People from L'Aquila